Edward Joseph Mearns (born 29 March 1989 in Edinburgh) is a Scottish footballer who plays part-time for Vale of Leithen F.C.

Dundee signed the youngster from Heart of Midlothian in the summer of 2008. He played in only four matches before being released by Jocky Scott on 3 February 2009. Mearns played 90 minutes in Berwick's 2–1 victory over Stenhousemuir on 21 February, . Mearns then signed for junior side Bonnyrigg Rose at the start of the 2009–10 season.

References 

DUNDEE : 1946/47 - 2008/09, Post War English & Scottish Football League A - Z Player's Transfer Database
BERWICK RANGERS : 1955/56 - 2008/09, Post War English & Scottish Football League A - Z Player's Transfer Database

1989 births
Living people
Footballers from Edinburgh
Scottish footballers
Association football midfielders
Heart of Midlothian F.C. players
Dundee F.C. players
Berwick Rangers F.C. players
Scottish Football League players
Bonnyrigg Rose Athletic F.C. players
Civil Service Strollers F.C players